Dutch-Slovenian relations are foreign relations between the Netherlands and Slovenia.  Both countries established diplomatic relations on June 25, 1991. The Netherlands has an embassy in Ljubljana.  Slovenia has an embassy in The Hague. 
Both countries are full members of NATO and of the European Union.

Diplomacy

of the Netherlands
Ljubljana (Embassy)

Republic of Slovenia
The Hague (Embassy)

See also 
 Foreign relations of the Netherlands
 Foreign relations of Slovenia

External links 
  Dutch Ministry of Foreign Affairs about relations with Slovenia (in Dutch only) 
  Dutch embassy in Ljubljana 
  Slovenian embassy in The Hague

 

 
S;ovenia
Bilateral relations of Slovenia